The Technical, Administrative and Supervisory Section (TASS) was a British trade union.

History
The union was founded in 1913 by 200 draughtsmen, as the Association of Engineering and Shipbuilding Draughtsmen (AESD).  It expanded rapidly, and had more than 14,000 member by the end of the decade.  Although it declined during the Great Depression, it retained most of its members by offering unemployment benefit, and by 1939 established a new high of 23,000 members, this rising to 44,000 by the end of World War II and over 75,000 by 1968.  From 1960, it accepted technicians in ancillary roles, changing its name to the Draughtsmen's and Allied Technicians' Association (DATA).

In 1970, DATA amalgamated with the Amalgamated Union of Engineering and Foundry Workers (AUEFW) and Constructional Engineering Union (CEU) to form the Amalgamated Union of Engineering Workers (AUEW).  The former members of DATA formed the Technical and Supervisory Section of the new union.  At the 1973 Representative Council Conference it was agreed to rename it the Technical, Administrative and Supervisory Section (TASS).

In 1985, after considerable problems within the AUEW, TASS broke away to become an independent union.

TASS absorbed the National Union of Gold, Silver and Allied Trades (NUGSAT) in 1981, the National Union of Sheet Metal Workers, Coppersmiths, Heating and Domestic Engineers in 1983, the Association of Patternmakers and Allied Craftsmen in 1984, the Tobacco Workers' Union in 1986, and the National Society of Metal Mechanics in 1987.

In 1988, it merged with the Association of Scientific, Technical and Managerial Staffs (ASTMS) to become the Manufacturing Science and Finance Union (MSF). MSF in turn merged with the AEEU to form Amicus in 2002. This resulted in TASS and the former AUEW (by then part of the AEEU) being re-united within one union.

Election results
The union sponsored Labour Party candidates in each Parliamentary election from 1950 onwards.

Leadership

General Secretaries
1913: L. Blair
1918: Peter Doig
1945: James Young
1952: George Doughty
1974: Ken Gill

Assistant General Secretaries
1919: David Manteklow
1920: David Manteklow and James Young
1929: Post vacant
1946: John Holland
1956: J. Dickinson

Deputy General Secretaries
1968: Ken Gill
1973: John Forrester
1979: Eric Winterbottom
1983: Barbara Switzer

References

External links
Catalogue of the TASS archives, held at the Modern Records Centre, University of Warwick.
Catalogue of the DATA archives, held at the Modern Records Centre, University of Warwick.

 
1913 establishments in the United Kingdom
1988 disestablishments in the United Kingdom
Amalgamated Engineering Union
Defunct trade unions of the United Kingdom
Trade unions established in 1913
Trade unions disestablished in 1988
Trade unions based in London